Paddy Bell may refer to:

Paddie Bell (1931–2005), Irish folk singer and musician
Mary Bell (aviator) (1903–1979), Australian aviator